Tunkuruz Hydroelectric Power Plant is a hydroelectric power plant in Beskol village, Alakol District, in Almaty Province, Kazakhstan.

References
Kaz-business.com

External links

Hydroelectric power stations in Kazakhstan